Little Mackinaw Township is located in Tazewell County, Illinois. As of the 2010 census, its population was 1,575 and it contained 678 housing units.

Geography

Demographics

References

External links
Mackinaw-Tazewell-IL.html City-data.com
Illinois State Archives

Townships in Tazewell County, Illinois
Peoria metropolitan area, Illinois
Townships in Illinois